Robert Mathias Stefik (October 8, 1923 – April 9, 2008) was a professional American football player.

Biography
Stefik was born Robert Mathias Stefik on October 8, 1923, in Madison, Wisconsin.

Career
Stefik was a member of the Buffalo Bills of the All-America Football Conference in 1948. He played at the collegiate level at Niagara University.

References

External links
 

Sportspeople from Madison, Wisconsin
Players of American football from Wisconsin
Buffalo Bills (AAFC) players
Niagara Purple Eagles football players
1923 births
2008 deaths